Taufua is a surname of Samoan origin. Notable people with the surname include:

Jordan Taufua (born 1992), New Zealand rugby union player
Jorge Taufua (born 1991), Australian rugby league player
Mark Taufua (born 1981), Australian rugby league player

Samoan-language surnames